The Comedian's Princess (Komediantská princezna) is a 1936 Czechoslovak comedy film, directed by Miroslav Cikán.

Cast
Jaroslav Vojta as Puppeteer Kratochvíl
Lída Baarová as Eva Kratochvílová
Otomar Korbelář as Factory owner Dvorský
Jára Kohout as Mayor Pivoňka
Věra Ferbasová as Táňa
Ladislav Pešek as Ferda Sekanina
Adina Mandlová as Lexová
Jaroslav Marvan as Lawyer

References

External links

1936 films
Czechoslovak comedy films
1936 comedy films
Films directed by Miroslav Cikán
Czechoslovak black-and-white films
1930s Czech-language films
1930s Czech films